Davos Wolfgang railway station is a railway station in the municipality of Davos, in the Swiss canton of Grisons. It is an intermediate stop on the  Landquart–Davos Platz line of the Rhaetian Railway. Trains stop at this station every two hours.

Services
The following services stop at Davos Wolfgang:

 Regio: limited service between Landquart and Davos Platz.

References

External links
 
 
 

Railway stations in Switzerland opened in 1890
Davos
Railway stations in Graubünden
Rhaetian Railway stations